Yeni yol is a village and municipality in the Goranboy Rayon of Azerbaijan. It has a population of 1,491.  The municipality consists of the villages of Yeni yol and Təhlə.

References

Populated places in Goranboy District